Living on Polka Time is an album by Jimmy Sturr, released through Rounder Records in 1997. In 1998, the album won Sturr the Grammy Award for Best Polka Album.

Track listing
 "Dear Hearts and Gentle People" (Fain, Hilliard) – 2:23
 "Speedline" (Kuciemba) – 2:23
 "(Hey Baby) Que Paso" (Meyers, Sheffield) – 3:45
 "On the Swing" (traditional) – 2:10
 "Always" (Henkler, Scholz, Sturr) – 2:38
 "I Love Polka Music" – 2:40
 "Sweet and Lovely" (Mack, Sturr) – 2:11
 "Loving Arms of Tennessee" (Dempsey, Reed) – 2:51
 "WWW Polka. Com" (DeBrown) – 3:03
 "Hoop de Doo" (DeLugg, Loesser) – 3:26
 "Bad Joe" (Wojnarowski) – 2:44
 "Fiddlemania" (traditional) – 3:25
 "Such a Way About You" (Meyer) – 2:16

See also
 Polka in the United States

References

1997 albums
Grammy Award for Best Polka Album
Jimmy Sturr albums
Rounder Records albums